Berné (Berne in Breton) is a commune in the Morbihan department in Brittany in northwestern France.

Population
Inhabitants of Berné are called Bernéens.

Geography

The commune is wooded and hilly. The forest of Pontcallec cover a large part of the commune's area. The river Scorff forms the commune's eastern and southern borders.

Map

History

Second world war

Seventeen french resistance fighters were shot dead  by the german soldiers in the Landordu wood. Some victims were buried alive. Their bodies were exhumed on July 6, 1944.

List of places

Gallery

See also
Communes of the Morbihan department

References

External links

Mayors of Morbihan Association 

Communes of Morbihan